The 59th Army was a field army of the Soviet Union's Red Army. It was formed in November 1941 in the Siberian Military District. It was soon redeployed to the Arkhangelsk Military District and by December was part of the Volkhov Front. From January to April 1942, it fought in the Lyuban offensive operation, an unsuccessful attempt to relieve Leningrad. For the next two years, the army defended its bridgehead on the Volkhov River. During spring 1944, it fought in the Leningrad–Novgorod offensive, which broke the siege of Leningrad. During the summer of 1944, the army fought in the Vyborg–Petrozavodsk offensive, helping to end the Continuation War. In December, the army transferred to the Sandomierz bridgehead, from which it launched the Vistula–Oder offensive in January 1945. At the end of January, the army crossed the Oder and then fought in the Lower Silesian offensive and the Upper Silesian offensive. By late March it was in the Sudetes. In May 1945, the army launched the Prague offensive. Postwar, the army headquarters was used to create the Stavropol Military District in July 1945.

History 
The 59th Army was formed on 15 November 1941 in the Siberian Military District in accordance with a Stavka order of 2 November. It included the 366th, 372nd, 374th, 376th, 378th and 382nd Rifle Divisions and the 78th and 87th Cavalry Divisions, as well as other smaller units. The army became part of Reserve of the Supreme High Command (Stavka Reserve) upon completion of formation and was transported westward by rail to the Arkhangelsk Military District. In early December, it helped construct the Cherepovets Fortified Area and improved the defensive line on the eastern shore of Lake Beloye and the Sheksna River. The line ran from the mouth of the Sheksna to the village of Myaksa.

On 18 December the army became part of the Volkhov Front, taking up defensive positions on the right bank of the Volkhov River in the area of Vodosye and Yefremove. Between January and April 1942, the army fought in the Lyuban offensive operation, during which it and the 4th and 52nd Armies, joined later by the 2nd Shock Army, attacked as part of the main attack of the front. The army was unable to fulfill its objectives. In January units of the army captured the settlements of Peresvet, Ostrov, and Kiprovo. In February, the army captured a bridgehead on the left bank of the Volkhov. During March and April the 59th Army disrupted German plans to complete the encirclement of the 2nd Shock Army and to prepare a new attack on Leningrad.

Commanders 
The army had two commanders during its existence.
Major General Ivan Galanin (2 November 1941 – 25 April 1942)
Major General (promoted to Lieutenant General November 1942) Ivan Korovnikov (25 April 1942 – 9 May 1945)

References 

Field armies of the Soviet Union
Military units and formations established in 1941
Military units and formations disestablished in 1945